Don Prudhomme (born April 6, 1941 in San Fernando, California), nicknamed "The Snake", is an American drag racer.

He was inducted into the Motorsports Hall of Fame of America in 1991.

Racing career

Prudhomme crewed for "TV Tommy" Ivo on Ivo's twin-engined slingshot in 1960.

In 1962, Prudhomme was a partner in the Greer-Black-Prudhomme fuel digger, which earned the best win record in National Hot Rod Association (NHRA) history, before switching to Funny Car. He would win the NHRA FC championship four times in his 35-year career. He earned the nickname "The Snake" in high school. He was the first Funny Car driver to exceed .

After trouble getting the "vaunted" Gilmore Engineering-chassied Donovan Engineering Special dragster sorted out, Tom McEwen  quit, and was replaced by Prudhomme, then owner-driver in the B&M Tork Master-sponsored car.

In 1965, Prudhomme faced Hot Wheels teammate McEwen at the Hot Rod Magazine Championship Drag Races, held at Riverside, "one of the most significant drag racing events" of that era; ultimately, Top Fuel Eliminator (TFE) went to Jim Warren.

He raced a Shelby Super Snake in the 1968 and 1969 seasons, powered by a Ford engine instead of the ubiquitous Chrysler Hemi. When Ford discontinued the program, Prudhomme went into the "Mongoose and Snake" phase of his career.

Prudhomme was known for his yellow 1970 Plymouth Barracuda in which he match raced Tom McEwen in his red 1970 Plymouth Duster, named Mongoose. Both drivers gained wider public attention from Mattel's "Hot Wheels" toy versions of the cars, released in 1970. Hot Wheels celebrated their 35th anniversary in 2005 with a two-day event.

In the 1980's Prudhomme gained widespread recognition among late night television viewers when David Letterman told a recurring joke about a new "Prudhomme restaurant" opening, ostensibly referencing world famous chef Paul Prudhomme, but then saying "no, Don Prudhomme!" claiming the menu included "Funny Car Veal" and "Nitro-burning Prawns".

He retired in 1994 to manage his own racing team. With driver Larry Dixon, Prudhomme's team won the Top Fuel championship in 2002 and 2003. In 2009, Dixon signed to drive the Al-Anabi Top Fuel Dragster, and Spencer Massey took over Prudhomme's car. At the end of the 2009 racing season, sponsorship went away and Prudhomme retired from active racing.
In 2019 Don Prudomme currently sponsors and built the Montana Brand / John Force Racing Top fuel dragster driven by Austin Prock in the NHRA Mello Yello Drag Racing Series

Film
Prudhomme's accomplishments in racing are featured in the 2013 movie Snake and Mongoose which features the rivalry between "The Snake" and Tom "The Mongoose" McEwen. The film also discusses how both drivers brought drag racing into mainstream with the Mattel Hot Wheels sponsorship. The movie was inspired by the book Snake vs. Mongoose: How a Rivalry Changed Drag Racing Forever, written by Tom Madigan.

Book
Don Prudhomme's early career is documented in the book, Six Seconds to Glory by Hal Higdon. The book covers the 1973 Nationals held in Indianapolis, a race in which Prudhomme was battling for his first Funny Car season title.

"Don “The Snake” Prudhomme: My Life Beyond the 1320" by Don Prudhomme and Elana Scherr was released Oct. 19, 2020 and covers his life in and out of racing.

Awards
In 2000, he was inducted into the International Motorsports Hall of Fame.
He was inducted in the Motorsports Hall of Fame of America in 1991.
On the National Hot Rod Association Top 50 Drivers 1951-2000, Don Prudhomme was ranked #3.

Images

References

External links
 'Snake' Racing
 NHRA profile
 Snake and Mongoose Movie IMDB profile
 // Six Seconds to Glory (book)

1941 births
American racing drivers
Dragster drivers
International Motorsports Hall of Fame inductees
Living people
People from San Fernando, California
Racing drivers from California